"Get Out My Head" is a song by Irish DJ and producer Shane Codd, who wrote and produced the song. Featuring uncredited vocals from Solah, it was released on 25 May 2020 by Polydor Records. "Get Out My Head" peaked at number five on the Irish Singles Chart. Outside Ireland, the single peaked within the top ten of the charts in the United Kingdom.

Background
Talking about the song, Codd said, "I wanted to get out and do things and I also wanted the stress of COVID out of my head, like I'm sure a lot of us did. The vocals really sat with me, making the track was like an escape for me. I remember the first time I played it in my car I got a release and a feel good vibe of it. I imagined festivals and people dancing, which felt like a distant memory during COVID. I posted the track online and immediately got a reaction. I was blown away. People were sharing it and tagging me, I was grateful and happy they liked it. I received messages from some people saying that it helped them during lockdown and that for them it was the tune of 2020, I couldn't believe the reaction it was getting."

In December 2020, the song reached the spot on Music Moves Europe Talent Chart and remained there for three weeks. In the same month, a video was released for it.

On 5 February 2021, a remix featuring British rappers Swarmz and S1mba was released.

On 18 February 2021, a remix by American DJ Todd Terry was released.

Personnel
Credits adapted from Tidal.
 Shane Codd – producer, composer, lyricist, associated performer, music production, programmer
 Stuart Hawkes – mastering engineer, studio personnel
 James F. Reynolds – mixer, studio personnel
 Solah – uncredited vocals

Charts

Weekly charts

Year-end charts

Certifications

Release history

References

2020 songs
2020 singles
Songs about the COVID-19 pandemic